Michael Bowes-Lyon is the name of:

 Michael Bowes-Lyon, 18th Earl of Strathmore and Kinghorne (1957–2016), former politician and former British Army officer
 Michael Bowes-Lyon, 17th Earl of Strathmore and Kinghorne (1928–1987), first cousin of Queen Elizabeth II and Princess Margaret